Kinsley Township is a township in Edwards County, Kansas, USA.  As of the 2000 census, its population was 160.

Geography
According to the USGS, it contains three cemeteries: Hillside, Old Kinsley and Saint Nicholas.

The stream of Little Coon Creek runs through this township.

Transportation
Kinsley Township contains one airport or landing strip, Kinsley Municipal Airport.

References
 USGS Geographic Names Information System (GNIS)

External links
 US-Counties.com
 City-Data.com

Townships in Edwards County, Kansas
Townships in Kansas